Criminology & Criminal Justice is a peer-reviewed academic journal covering the field of criminology. The journal's editors-in-chief are Michele Burman, Laura Piacentini and Sarah Armstrong. It was established in 2001 and is published by SAGE Publications in association with the British Society of Criminology.

Abstracting and indexing 
The journal is abstracted and indexed in Scopus and the Social Sciences Citation Index. Its 2020 impact factor is 2.672, ranking it 31 out of 69 journals in the category "Criminology & Penology".

References

External links 
 

SAGE Publishing academic journals
English-language journals
Criminology journals
Publications established in 2001
5 times per year journals